Jose Domingo Medrano (born 4 August 1920) graduated from the National University in San Salvador and was a famous doctor in El Salvador from 1961-1986. He was a member of the Salvadorean Drug Administration and patented over 10 medical products. After an accident which burned most of his body, he left his fortune to the San Miguel and Rosales Hospital Burn Centres.

See also
 Julio Adalberto Rivera Carballo

References

 https://web.archive.org/web/20071026054549/http://archive.laprensa.com.sv/20040423/departamentos/departamentos15.asp

External links
 Time (magazine)

Salvadoran physicians
1920 births
Possibly living people